Oldboys is a 2009 Danish comedy film directed by Nikolaj Steen.

Cast 
 Kristian Halken - Vagn Bendtsen
 Robert Hansen - John Lund
 Laura Christensen - Jeanne
 Rasmus Bjerg - Henrik B
 Leif Sylvester Petersen - Svend Erik
 Ole Thestrup - Bent
 Elith Nulle Nykjær - Erling
 Niels Skousen - Preben
 Bodil Jørgensen - Bente

Plot 
Vagn is a middle-aged man whose life has slowly ground to a halt. He lives by himself, has a job and plays old boys' football. On the annual team trip to Sweden, the other members of the team forget him at a gas station. As Vagn well knows, he is all too forgettable. Throwing his lot in with a hapless robber, John, he hustles to catch up with the team bus, beginning a journey that slowly but surely brings him out of himself and back among the living.

References

External links 

2009 comedy films
2009 films
Danish comedy films
Danish-language films
Films set in Sweden